Laurence Lerner (12 December 1925 – 19 January 2016), often called Larry, was a South African-born British literary critic, poet, novelist, and lecturer, recognized for his achievement with his election to The Royal Society of Literature.

Biography
Laurence Lerner was born in Cape Town, South Africa; his Jewish father Israel was from Zhitomir, Ukraine and his mother May from Abinger Hammer, England. He was educated at St George's Grammar School, Cape Town, the University of Cape Town and Pembroke College, Cambridge.

He was lecturer in English, from 1949 to 1953 at the University College of the Gold Coast in West Africa, from 1953 to 1962 tutor then lecturer in English at Queen's University Belfast (where one of his students was Seamus Heaney), lecturer then reader then professor of English at the University of Sussex (1962–84), and Edwin Mims Professor of English at Vanderbilt University, Nashville, Tennessee (1985–95). He won the 1991 Harvie Branscomb Distinguished Professor Award.

Lerner taught in many universities around the world in addition to those where he held positions jobs, including Munich, Dijon, various places in the US and Canada, Kashmir, Wurzburg, and Vienna. On British Council lecture tours he traveled to France, Germany, Spain, South America, Turkey and India. These experiences led to his most personal book, Wandering Professor.

Although he described himself as a follower who was surprised to be accepted, Lerner was an active member of the Society of Friends (Quakers), attending Brighton, Nashville and then Lewes meetings.  For many years, he taught a Shakespeare summer school at the Woodbrooke Quaker Study Centre.  He gave the Swarthmore Lecture in 1984 (The Two Cinnas – Quakerism, Revolution and Poetry). He was Clerk to the Lewes meeting for several years. He was also a Governor of Leighton Park School, a Quaker school in England.

He published nine collections of poetry, three novels, ten books of literary criticism, reflections on English language usage and life as a professor, and lectures, essays and poems.  He edited two anthologies of modern literary criticism of Shakespeare's plays for Penguin Books, which were widely used by A-level students in the UK.

Personal life
He married Natalie Winch in 1948, whom he met in South Africa. Their marriage lasted until her death in 2014. They had four sons, David and Edwin, born in Accra, Ghana, and Martin and Richard, born in Belfast, Northern Ireland.

He died on 19 January 2016 at the age of 90.

Works

Poetry
Domestic Interior,  Hutchinson, 1959
The Directions of Memory,  Chatto & Windus, 1964
Selves, Routledge, 1969 .

A.R.T.H.U.R & M.A.R.T.H.A. The loves of the computers,  Secker & Warburg, 1980 
The Man I Killed, Secker & Warburg, 1980 
Chapter & Verse: Bible Poems, Secker & Warburg, 1984 
Selected Poems, Secker & Warburg, 1984
Rembrandt's Mirror, Secker & Warburg, 1987

Fiction
The Englishman, Hamish Hamilton, 1959
A Free Man, Chatto & Windus, 1968 
My Grandfather's Grandfather, Secker & Warburg, 1985

Criticism 
The Truest Poetry: An essay on the Question, What is Literature? Hamish Hamilton, 1960
The Art of George Eliot. A selection of contemporary reviews (including Henry James, George Saintsbury, Geraldine Jewsbury and Sidney Colvin), with John Holstrom, Bodley Head, 1966
The Truthtellers: Jane Austen, George Eliot, D H Lawrence, Chatto & Windus, 1967
The Uses of Nostalgia: Studies in Pastoral, Chatto & Windus, 1972 
An introduction to English poetry: fifteen poems discussed by Laurence Lerner, Edward Arnold, 1975 .
The Victorians, Methuen, 1978, 
Love & Marriage: Literature in its Social Context, Edward Arnold, 1979
The Literary Imagination: Essays on Literature & Society, Harvester, 1982
The Frontiers of Literature, Blackwell, 1988
Angels and Absences: child deaths in the nineteenth century, Vanderbilt University Press, 1997,

Other works
Shakespeare's Tragedies; An Anthology of Modern Criticism, Penguin, 1963, ASIN B000GR3A7W
Shakespeare's Comedies; An Anthology of Modern Criticism, Penguin, 1967, ASIN B002R84WZC
"The History of a Poem", The Dark Horse, Summer 1997Wandering Professor, Caliban, 1999, .

Poem
Here is a poem by Laurence Lerner (not infringing copyright, since submitted by the author, who holds the copyright!)Kaspar Hauser''

All that long time there was the place I was,
All that long same, the dark and constant same.
I came to being and it bit my eyes.

I want to be a rider like my father.
A soldier was my father was a horseman.
I want to be a rider and I want

Out of that same he carried me upstairs,
Out of that dark and then I stood to lean;
The soft ground stood and hit me where I fell.

When it was hunger time they put soft life
Into my mouth. It moved. The warm flesh tore
Under my teeth. This could be me I'm eating.

I spat and called: I loved that time, those horses,
The brittle bread, the water, the soft dark,
The stiff floor always there, the always steady

Till I was carried to the bumpy world:
The air threw needles at my eyes. I fell.
Where were my walls, my horse to push, and where –

I want my floor my bread my dark my always –
I want the same the only same the only –
I want to be a rider like my father

Readings
Readings by Laurence Lerner of several of his poems appear on YouTube

See also

List of South Africans

References

External links
 "Laurence Lerner" (Fellows Remembered), The Royal Society of Literature

1925 births
2016 deaths
Academics of Queen's University Belfast
British poets
British Jews
British Quakers
Jewish poets
South African poets
South African Jews
Lithuanian Jews
Alumni of Pembroke College, Cambridge
University of Cape Town alumni
Fellows of the Royal Society of Literature
South African literary critics
British male poets
South African emigrants to the United Kingdom